The 1997 PBA season was the 23rd season of the Philippine Basketball Association (PBA).

Board of governors

Executive committee
 Emilio P. Bernardino, Jr. (Commissioner) 
 Nazario L. Avendaño (Chairman, representing San Miguel Beermen)
 Bernabe L. Navarro, Jr. (Vice-Chairman, representing Gordon's Gin Boars)
 Reynaldo G. Gamboa (Treasurer, representing Formula Shell Zoommasters)

Teams

Season highlights
For the first time in league history, the top two picks of the Annual Rookie draft were born outside the Philippines, 6–9 Andrew John Seigle, and Nic Belasco were selected at numbers one and two, respectively.   
Purefoods Corned Beef Cowboys and Gordon's Gin Boars (formerly Ginebra) played in the All-Filipino Cup finals. This is only the second time the two rivals meet in a championship series. Gordon's playing coach Sonny Jaworski became the oldest player to play in a PBA finals series at age 51. Purefoods rookie coach Eric Altamirano won his first title as a head mentor.
Gordon's Gin Boars ended a six-year title drought for the La Tondeña franchise by winning the Commissioner's Cup title over defending champion Alaska Milkmen.
The Alaska Milkmen retains the Governors' Cup title for the fourth straight time and defend the only crown left in their grandslam conquest last season. Alaska has overtaken the defunct Presto franchise as the fourth winningest ballclub in the PBA.
Alvin Patrimonio won his fourth MVP award, tying Ramon Fernandez for the most number of MVP awards.

Opening ceremonies
The muses for the participating teams are as follows:

Champions
 All-Filipino Cup: Purefoods Corned Beef Cowboys
 Commissioner's Cup: Gordon's Gin Boars
 Governor's Cup: Alaska Milkmen
 Team with best win–loss percentage: Alaska Milkmen (35–25, .583)
 Best Team of the Year: Alaska Milkmen (2nd)

All-Filipino Cup

Elimination round

Semifinal round

Third place playoff 

|}

Finals

|}
Finals MVP: Alvin Patrimonio (Purefoods)
Best Player of the Conference: Nelson Asaytono (San Miguel)

Commissioner's Cup

Elimination round

Semifinal round

Third place playoff 

|}

Finals 

|}
Finals MVP: Marlou Aquino (Gordon's Gin)
Best Player of the Conference: Kenneth Duremdes (Alaska)
Best Import of the Conference: Jeff Ward (San Miguel)

Governors' Cup

Elimination round

Playoffs

Finals 

|}
Finals MVP: Johnny Abarrientos (Alaska)
Best Player of the Conference: Alvin Patrimonio (Purefoods)
Best Import of the Conference: Larry Robinson (San Miguel)

Individual awards
 Most Valuable Player: Alvin Patrimonio (Purefoods)
 Rookie of the Year:  Andy Seigle (Mobiline)
 Sportsmanship Award: Freddie Abuda (San Miguel)
 Most Improved Player: Bong Ravena (Purefoods)
 Defensive Player of the Year: Freddie Abuda (San Miguel)
 Mythical Five: 
Johnny Abarrientos (Alaska) 
Alvin Patrimonio (Purefoods) 
Marlou Aquino (Gordon's Gin) 
Vince Hizon (Gordon's Gin) 
Nelson Asaytono (San Miguel)
 Mythical Second Team: 
Noli Locsin (Gordon's Gin)
Dindo Pumaren (Purefoods)
Bong Ravena (Purefoods) 
Jun Limpot (Sta. Lucia) 
Jerry Codiñera (Purefoods)
 All Defensive Team: 
Jerry Codiñera (Purefoods) 
Freddie Abuda (San Miguel) 
Johnny Abarrientos (Alaska) 
Jeffrey Cariaso (Mobiline) 
Marlou Aquino (Gordon's Gin)

Awards given by the PBA Press Corps
 Coach of the Year: Ron Jacobs (San Miguel)
 Mr. Quality Minutes: Paul Alvarez (San Miguel)
 Executive of the Year: Simon Mossesgeld (Purefoods)
 Comeback Player of the Year: Paul Alvarez (San Miguel)
 Referee of the Year: Ernesto de Leon

Cumulative standings

References

 
PBA